Midnight in San Juan is a smooth jazz studio album by Earl Klugh released on February 19, 1991. The album was a commercial success as it reached No.1 on many jazz radio and retail charts, including hitting No.1 on the Top Contemporary Jazz Albums charts. In this release, Klugh lays heavy emphasis on Latin and Caribbean elements. Two songs on the album feature legendary NEA Jazz Master Jean "Toots" Thielemans on the harmonica and Grammy Award winner Don Sebesky as conductor and arranger.

Track listing 
All songs written by Earl Klugh.
 "Midnight in San Juan" – 5:53
 "Every Moment with You" – 3:57
 "Kissin' on the Beach" – 6:07
 "She Never Said Why" – 4:32
 "Movimientos del Alma (Rhythms of the Soul)" – 4:40
 "Jamaican Winds" – 3:44
 "Theme for a Rainy Day" – 5:26
 "Take You There" – 7:06

Personnel

Musicians
 Earl Klugh – guitar, keyboards
 Toots Thielemans – harmonica
 Ron Carter – bass
 Chuck Loeb – guitar
 Paul McGill – guitar
 Jose Oribe – guitar
 Oscar Hernández – bass
 Lucio Hopper – bass
 Abraham Laboriel, Sr. – bass
 Eliane Elias – piano
 Ruben Rodriquez – piano
 Sammy Figueroa – percussion
 Paulinho Da Costa – percussion
 Ralph Irizarry – percussion
 Barnaby Finch – keyboards
 Ronnie Foster – keyboards
 Mark Nilan – keyboards
 Richard Tee – electric piano
 Robby Ameen – drums
 Harvey Mason, Sr. – drums
 Buddy Williams – drums

Technical
 Earl Klugh – producer
 Bruce Hervey – production coordination
 David Palmer – engineer, mixing 
 Bob Ludwig – mastering
 Gene Dunlap – drum programing
 Don Sebesky – arranger, conductor
 David Matthews – conductor, horn arrangements

Charts

References 

1990 albums
Earl Klugh albums
Albums arranged by Don Sebesky
Warner Records albums